Lisa Guenther is a Canadian philosopher and activist, known for her efforts to take philosophy into extraordinary settings. Guenther's work takes up solitary confinement, prison torture, reproductive injustice, and the carceral state.

Education and career
Cross-appointed to the Department of Philosophy and the Graduate Program in Cultural Studies, Lisa Guenther is currently Queen’s National Scholar in Political Philosophy and Critical Prison Studies at Queen's University in Kingston, Ontario, Canada. Prior to 2018, she served as Associate Professor of Philosophy at Vanderbilt University. Her first academic position was at the University of Auckland. Guenther received a bachelor's degree from Bishop's University, and doctorate from University of Toronto.

Research areas
Guenther specializes in feminist philosophy, phenomenology, and political philosophy. Her book has been described by the Notre Dame Philosophical Reviews as "a liberation manifesto in struggles against captivity".

Public philosophy
Guenther's work with inmates on death row in Riverbend maximum security prison in Nashville has received considerable media attention. In her interview with The Boston Review she describes her efforts as being grounded in a new understanding of what philosophy is: "I now approach philosophy as a radical democratic practice of collective sense-making." The Chronicle of Higher Education in its profile of Guenther called her "radical advocate for prison reform."

See also
Hypatia transracialism controversy

References

External links
 Lisa Guenther at Queen's University

Year of birth missing (living people)
Living people
Canadian women philosophers
Feminist philosophers
21st-century Canadian philosophers
Political philosophers
Bishop's University alumni
University of Toronto alumni
Vanderbilt University faculty
Phenomenologists